Major events in 1974 include the aftermath of the 1973 oil crisis and the resignation of United States President Richard Nixon following the Watergate scandal. In the Middle East, the aftermath of the 1973 Yom Kippur War determined politics; following Israeli Prime Minister Golda Meir's resignation in response to high Israeli casualties, she was succeeded by Yitzhak Rabin. In Europe, the invasion and occupation of northern Cyprus by Turkish troops initiated the Cyprus dispute, the Carnation Revolution took place in Portugal, and Chancellor of West Germany Willy Brandt resigned following an espionage scandal surrounding his secretary Günter Guillaume. In sports, the year was primarily dominated by the FIFA World Cup in West Germany, in which the German national team won the championship title, as well as The Rumble in the Jungle, a boxing match between Muhammad Ali and George Foreman in Zaire.

Events

January–February

 January 26 – Bülent Ecevit of CHP forms the new government of Turkey (37th government, partner MSP).
 February 1
 Fire breaks out in the Joelma Building in São Paulo, Brazil; 177 die, 293 are injured, 11 die later of their injuries.
 Kuala Lumpur, the capital of Malaysia, is declared a Federal Territory.
 February 8 – After a record 84 days in orbit, the crew of Skylab 4 returns to Earth.
 February 17 – Zamalek disaster: a soccer stampede occurs in Cairo, killing 49.
 February 28 – The British election ended in a hung parliament after the Jeremy Thorpe-led Liberal Party achieves its biggest vote.

March–April
 March 3 – Turkish Airlines Flight 981, travelling from Paris to London, crashes in the woods near Paris, killing all 346 aboard. This becomes the deadliest single aircraft accident with no survivors.
 March 4
 Following a hung parliament in the United Kingdom general election, Conservative prime minister Edward Heath resigns and is succeeded by Labour's Harold Wilson, who previously led the country from 1964 to 1970.
 March 18–End of five-month oil embargo by most OPEC nations against the United States, Europe, and Japan which had caused the 1973 oil crisis.
 March 26 – A group of peasant women in Chamoli district, Uttarakhand, India, use their bodies to surround trees to prevent loggers from felling them, giving rise to the Chipko movement.
 March 29
 The Terracotta Army of Qin Shi Huang is discovered at Xi'an, China.
 Launch of the Volkswagen Golf in West Germany, a modern front-wheel drive hatchback which is expected to replace the iconic Volkswagen Beetle, holder of the world record for the car with the most units produced.
 April 3–4 – An enormous tornado outbreak strikes the central parts of the United States, killing around 319 and injuring about 5,484.
 April 6 – Swedish pop group ABBA's song Waterloo wins the 1974 Eurovision Song Contest in Brighton, England, UK.
 April 11 – The Kiryat Shmona massacre takes place in Israel.
 April 24 – Guillaume Affair: exposure of an East German spy Günter Guillaume within the West German government, leading to the resignation of West German Chancellor Willy Brandt.
 April 25 – Carnation Revolution: A left-wing military coup in Portugal restores democracy, ending 41 years of the Estado Novo dictatorship in the country. Portuguese Prime Minister Marcelo Caetano flees to Brazil and is granted political asylum by Brazilian President Ernesto Geisel.

May–June

 May 4
 An all-female Japanese team summits Manaslu in Nepal, becoming the first women to climb an  peak.
 The Expo '74 world's fair opens in Spokane, Washington.
 May 7 – Willy Brandt, West Germany's chancellor, resigns.
 May 11: A violent 7.1 earthquake shakes the Chinese city of Zhaotong causing between 1,600 and 20,000 deaths.
 May 16 – Helmut Schmidt becomes the new Chancellor of West Germany.
 May 17 – The Troubles: The Dublin and Monaghan bombings are carried out by the Ulster Volunteer Force (UVF), when they explode four car bombs in counties Dublin and Monaghan in the Republic of Ireland. The attacks kills 33 civilians and wounds almost 300, the highest number of casualties in any single event during the conflict.
 May 18
 1974 Australian federal election: Gough Whitlam's Labor Government is re-elected with a reduced majority, defeating the Liberal/Country Coalition led by Billy Snedden. Whitlam consequently becomes the first Labor Prime Minister to be re-elected in his own right. The Democratic Labor Party meanwhile loses all five of their Senate seats, effectively wiping them out as a political force. 
 Nuclear weapons testing: Under Project Smiling Buddha, India successfully detonates its first nuclear weapon, becoming the 6th nation to do so.
 June 13 – The 1974 FIFA World Cup soccer tournament begins in West Germany.
 June 17 – A bomb explodes in Westminster Hall, the oldest part of the British Houses of Parliament. The hall's annex, housing offices, and a canteen are destroyed by the bombing, attributed by police to the Provisional wing of the Irish Republican Army.
 June 29 – Isabel Perón is sworn in as the first female President of Argentina, replacing her sick husband Juan Perón, who dies 2 days later.

July–August

 July 7 – West Germany beats the Netherlands 2–1 to win the 1974 FIFA World Cup. The West German football team is awarded the new FIFA World Cup Trophy.
 July 15 – The Greek military junta sponsors a coup d'état in Cyprus, replacing President Makarios III with Nikos Sampson.
 July 19 – Railcar explosion in Decatur, Illinois. A tanker car collides with a Norfolk & Western boxcar. Seven people are killed, 349 are injured and $18 million in property damage.
 July 20 – The Turkish invasion of Cyprus occurs.
 July 23 – The Greek military junta is replaced by a civilian government, the metapolitefsi.
 August 4 – A bomb explodes in a train between Italy and West Germany, killing twelve and wounding 48. Italian neo-fascists take responsibility.
 Watergate scandal: 
 August 8 - U.S. President Richard Nixon announces his resignation on August 8, effective at noon on August 9. 
 August 9 - Vice President Gerald Ford is sworn in as the 38th President of the United States upon Nixon's resignation.
 August 14
 Turkey invades Cyprus for the second time, occupying 37% of the island's territory.
 Greece withdraws its forces from NATO's military command structure, as a result of the Turkish invasion of Cyprus.
 August 30 – An express train bound for Germany from Belgrade derails in Zagreb, Yugoslavia (now Croatia), killing more than 150 passengers.

September–October
 September 8 - TWA Flight 841 crashes into the Ionian Sea 18 minutes after takeoff from Athens, after a bomb explodes in the cargo hold, and kills 88 people.
 September 10 – The Portuguese military junta grants independence to Guinea-Bissau.
 September 12 – Emperor Haile Selassie of Ethiopia is deposed by the Derg, bringing an end to the Solomonic dynasty's rule since 1270. The Ethiopian Civil War begins.
 September 12 – African Youth Amílcar Cabral is founded in Guinea-Bissau.
 September 13 – Japanese Red Army members seize the French Embassy in The Hague, Netherlands.
 September 20 – The Kootenai War is declared, and 10-cent tolls are charged on U.S. Highway 95.
 October 11 – The UK Labour government of Harold Wilson wins the second general election of the year, forming a three-seat majority. Wilson, who has led the party for a total of 11 years, has now won four of the five general elections he has contested.
 October 26 - Fuerzas Armadas de Liberación Nacional Puertorriqueña (FALN) sets off 5 bombs in Manhattan, with their largest bomb set off in the Financial District.

November–December

 November 1 – The World Tourism Organization (WTO) is established.
 November 5 – The Democratic Party makes big gains nationwide in House, Senate, and Gubernatorial elections.
 November 16 – Arecibo message: The radio telescope at the Arecibo Observatory on Puerto Rico sends an interstellar radio message towards Messier 13, the Great Globular Cluster in Hercules. The message will reach its destination around the year 27,000.
 November 17 – The 1974 Greek legislative election, the first election since the fall of the Greek junta of 1967–1974, is held and the newly formed New Democracy party wins 220 of 300 seats in the Hellenic Parliament.
 November 18 – The International Energy Agency is founded.
 November 20 – Lufthansa Flight 540 crashes in Nairobi, Kenya due to a mechanical failure, killing 59 of its 157 passengers.
 November 21 – Birmingham pub bombings: In Birmingham, England, two pubs are bombed, killing 21 people in an attack widely believed at the time to be linked to the Provisional Irish Republican Army. The Birmingham Six are later sentenced to life in prison for this, but their convictions are quashed after a lengthy campaign.
 November 22 – The United Nations General Assembly grants the Palestine Liberation Organization observer status.
 November 24 – A skeleton from the hominid species Australopithecus afarensis is discovered and named Lucy.
 November 26 – Anneline Kriel is crowned as Miss World 1974, the second South African to hold the title after Penny Coelen in 1958, when Helen Morgan resigns four days after winning the 24th Miss World pageant.
 December 9 – The Paris summit, reuniting the European Communities' heads of state and government, commences.
 December 13 – Malta becomes a republic.
 December 17 – The World Intellectual Property Organization (WIPO) becomes a specialized agency of the United Nations.
 December 24–25 – Darwin, Australia is almost completely destroyed by Cyclone Tracy.

Date unknown
 Rubik's Cube puzzle is invented by Hungarian architecture professor Ernő Rubik.

Births

January
 January 3 
 Alessandro Petacchi, Italian road cyclist
 Katie Porter, American politician
 January 9 – Farhan Akhtar, Indian film director, screenwriter, actor, singer, producer, and television host
 January 10 – Hrithik Roshan, Indian actor
 January 12
 Melanie C, English pop singer (Spice Girls)
 Tor Arne Hetland, Norwegian cross-country skier
 January 14 – Kevin Durand, Canadian-American actor and singer
 January 16 – Kate Moss, English model
 January 19 – Natassia Malthe, Norwegian actress and model
 January 22 – Joseph Muscat, 13th Prime Minister of Malta
 January 23 – Tiffani Thiessen, American actress
 January 24 – Ed Helms, American actor and stand-up comedian
 January 25 – Emily Haines, American-Canadian singer
 January 27 – Ole Einar Bjørndalen, Norwegian biathlete
 January 28 – Kari Traa, Norwegian freestyle skier
 January 29 
 Michael Andersen, Danish basketball player
 Kōji Wada, Japanese rock singer (d. 2016)
 January 30
 Christian Bale, British actor
 Olivia Colman, English actress

February
 February 1 - Roberto Heras, Spanish road cyclist
 February 3 
 Ayanna Pressley, American politician
 Miriam Yeung, Hong Kong actress and singer
 February 4
 Urmila Matondkar, Indian actress
 Shahab Hosseini, Iranian actor and film director
 February 7
 J Dilla, American record producer and rapper (d. 2006)
 Steve Nash, Canadian basketball player
 Nujabes, Japanese record producer and DJ (d. 2010)
 February 8
 Seth Green, American actor and comedian
 Guy-Manuel de Homem-Christo, French musician and record producer
 Kimbo Slice, Bahamian-born American boxer and mixed martial artist (d. 2016)
 February 10
 Elizabeth Banks, American actress and film director
David Datuna, Georgian-American artist (d. 2022)
 Ivri Lider, Israeli singer
 February 11 – Alex Jones, American radio host, conspiracy theorist, author and filmmaker
 February 12 – Naseem Hamed, British boxer
 February 13 – Robbie Williams, British singer
 February 14
 Philippe Léonard, Belgian footballer
 Valentina Vezzali, Italian fencer
 February 15
 Mr Lordi, Finnish singer
 Alexander Wurz, Austrian racing driver
 February 16 – Mahershala Ali, American actor and rapper
 February 17 – Jerry O'Connell, American actor
 February 17 – Nadine Labaki, Lebanese film director, actress and activist
 February 22 
 James Blunt, English singer
 David Pelletier, Canadian pair skater
 February 25
 Divya Bharti, Indian film actress (d. 1993)
 Dominic Raab, British politician, Deputy Prime Minister of the United Kingdom
 February 26 – Sébastien Loeb, French rally driver
 February 27 – Hiroyasu Shimizu, Japanese speed skater

March
 March 4
 Karol Kučera, Slovak tennis player
 Ariel Ortega, Argentine football player
 March 5
 Jens Jeremies, German footballer
 Matt Lucas, British actor and comedian
 Eva Mendes, American actress and model
 Hiten Tejwani, Indian model and actor
 March 6 – Anthony Carelli, Canadian professional wrestler
 March 7
 Jenna Fischer, American actress
 Antonio de la Rúa, Argentine lawyer
 March 9 – Nalbert Bitencourt, Brazilian volleyball player
 March 14 – Grace Park, Canadian actress
 March 13 
 Thomas Enqvist, Swedish tennis player
 Vampeta, Brazilian football player and coach
 March 15 – Percy Montgomery, South African rugby union player
 March 19 – Vida Guerra, Cuban born-American model and actress
 March 20 – Carsten Ramelow, German footballer
 March 22
 Marcus Camby, American basketball player
 Kidada Jones, American actress
 Bassem Youssef, Egyptian journalist and comedian
 March 24 – Alyson Hannigan, American actress
 March 26 – Laurel Lee, American politician and lawyer
 March 28 – Daisuke Kishio, Japanese voice actor
 March 29 – Miguel Gómez, Colombian photographer
 March 30 – Miho Komatsu, Japanese pop singer and songwriter
 March 31
 Natali, Russian singer, composer and songwriter
 Jani Sievinen, Finnish swimmer

April
 April 2 – Håkan Hellström, Swedish musician
 April 6 – Robert Kovač, Croatian football player and coach
 April 8 – Chris Kyle, American sniper (d. 2013)
 April 9 – Jenna Jameson, American adult actress and model
 April 11 
 Àlex Corretja, Spanish tennis player
 Tricia Helfer, Canadian actress and model
 April 12 
 Marley Shelton, American actress
 Sylvinho, Brazilian footballer
 April 13 – Marta Jandová, Czech musician and actress
 April 15 
 Danny Pino, Cuban American actor
 Tim Thomas, American Ice Hockey player
 April 16 – Xu Jinglei, Chinese actress and director
 April 17
 Mikael Åkerfeldt, Swedish musician (Opeth) 
 Victoria Beckham, English singer and fashion designer
 April 18
 Lorraine Pilkington, Irish actress
 Edgar Wright, English film director 
 April 21 – Oleksiy Zhuravko, Ukrainian politician (d. 2022)
 April 23 – Jennifer Paz, Filipino actress
 April 24 – Stephen Wiltshire, British architectural artist and autistic savant
April 25 - Grant Achatz, American chef and restaurateur 
 April 28 – Penélope Cruz, Spanish actress and model
 April 29 – Anggun, Indonesian-French singer-songwriter

May
 May 1 – Lornah Kiplagat, Kenyan-Dutch runner
 May 2 – Matt Berry, English actor and singer
 May 3 – Princess Haya bint Al Hussein of Jordan
 May 7 
 Lawrence Johnson, American pole vaulter
 Breckin Meyer, American actor
 May 8 – Marge Kõrkjas, Estonian swimmer
 May 9 – Brian Deegan, American Motocross Racer
 May 10
 Liu Fang, Chinese pipa player
 Sylvain Wiltord, French footballer
 May 11 –  Simon Aspelin, Swedish tennis player
 May 14 – Chantal Kreviazuk, Canadian singer-songwriter 
 May 16 – Laura Pausini, Italian singer
 May 17 – Andrea Corr, Irish singer
 May 19 
 Andrew Johns, Australian rugby league player
 Nawazuddin Siddiqui, Indian film actor
 May 20 – Mikael Stanne, Swedish singer
 May 21 – Fairuza Balk, American actress and musician
 May 22
 Sean Gunn, American actor
 Henrietta Ónodi, Hungarian artistic gymnast
 May 23 – Jewel, American singer
 May 26 – Lars Frölander, Swedish swimmer
 May 27 
 Marjorie Taylor Greene, American politician
 Gürkan Uygun, Turkish actor
 May 28 
 Hans-Jörg Butt, German footballer
 Misbah-ul-Haq, Pakistani cricketer 
 May 29 – Steve Cardenas, American martial artist and actor
 May 30 – Big L, American rapper (d. 1999)
 May 31 – Kenan Doğulu, Turkish pop musician

June
 June 1 – Alanis Morissette, Canadian-American singer
 June 2 – Gata Kamsky, American chess player
 June 3 – Martín Karpan, Argentinian actor
 June 7 
 Mahesh Bhupathi, Indian tennis player
 Helen Vollam, Principal Trombone Player for the BBC Symphony Orchestra.
 Bear Grylls, British survivalist
 June 13
 Katharina Bellowitsch, Austrian radio and TV presenter.
 Selma, Icelandic singer
 Steve-O, American actor
 June 18 – Kenan İmirzalıoğlu, Turkish actor and model
 June 21 
 Natasha Beaumont, Malaysian actress and model
 Maggie Siff, American actress
 Hitoshi Uematsu, Japanese short track speed skater
 June 22
 Devayani, Indian actress
 Donald Faison, American actor
 B. V. S. Ravi, Indian writer
 Tu Tamarua, Cook Islands rugby union flanker
 Vijay, Indian actor
 June 23 
 Joel Edgerton, Australian actor and filmmaker
 Kim Young-chul, South Korean comedian and singer
 Andi Vasluianu, Romanian actor
 June 24 
 Andrea De Cruz, Singaporean actress
 Ruffa Gutierrez, Filipino model, beauty queen and actress
 June 25 
 Karisma Kapoor, Indian actress
 Tereza Pergnerová, Czech actress, singer and television presenter
 June 26
 Derek Jeter, American baseball player
 Ecija Ojdanić, Croatian actress
 Nicole Saba, Lebanese singer and actress
 Kristofer Steen, Swedish musician
 Matt Striker, American professional wrestler and commentator
 June 27 – Christopher O'Neill, British-American businessman, Swedish royal
 June 28 – Nelson Mariano II, Filipino chess Grandmaster 
 June 29 – Pua Khein-Seng, Malaysian businessman
 June 30 – Hezekiél Sepeng, South African middle-distance athlete

July
 July 1 
 Timmy Hung, Hong Kong actor
 Jefferson Pérez, Ecuadorean race walker
 July 2 – Moon So-ri, South Korean actress, film director and screenwriter
 July 3 
 Taiga Ishikawa, Japanese politician and LGBT activist
 Marko Milošević, Serbian fugitive and refugee
 July 4
 Kevin Hanchard, Canadian actor
 Karole Rocher, French actress
 July 6 – Zé Roberto, Brazilian footballer
 July 7 – Jennifer Jones, Canadian curler
 July 8
 Jeanna Friske, Russian singer, actress, model and socialite (d. 2015)
 Dragoslav Jevrić, Montenegrin footballer
 July 12
 Parvin Dabas, Indian actor, model and director
 Sharon den Adel, Dutch singer
 July 14 
 Martina Hill, German actress, comedian and impersonator
 David Mitchell, British comedian and actor
 July 20 – Doug Ithier, Australian footballer
 July 22
 Franka Potente, German actress and singer
 Johnny Strong, American actor
 July 23
 Maurice Greene, American athlete
 Kathryn Hahn, American actress
 Stephanie March, American actress
 Rik Verbrugghe, Belgian road racing cyclist
 July 24
 Eva Aridjis, Mexican-American director and screenwriter
 July 25 – Lauren Faust, American animator
 July 26 – Daniel Negreanu, Canadian poker player
 July 28 
 Elizabeth Berkley, American actress
 Alexis Tsipras, Greek politician
 July 29 – Josh Radnor, American actor
 July 30 – Hilary Swank, American actress
 July 31 – Emilia Fox, English actress

August
 August 5 – Kajol, Indian actress
 August 6 – Ever Carradine, American actress
 August 7 – Michael Shannon, American actor
 August 9 – Derek Fisher, American basketball player
 August 13 – Niklas Sundin, Swedish musician
 August 14 – Christopher Gorham, American actor
 August 15 – Natasha Henstridge, Canadian actress and model
 August 16
 Didier Cuche, Swiss alpine skier
 Krisztina Egerszegi, Hungarian swimmer
 August 20
 Amy Adams, American actress
 Misha Collins, American actor
 Deborah Gravenstijn, Brazilian judoka
 Maxim Vengerov, Russian-Israeli violinist
 August 22
 Cory Gardner, American politician
 Jenna Leigh Green, American actress and singer
 Lee Sheppard, Australian cartoonist
 August 23
 Ray Park, Scottish actor and martial artist
 Ovi, Romanian-Norwegian singer-songwriter, producer and musician
 Shifty Shellshock, American singer
 August 24 – Jennifer Lien, American actress
 August 28 – Carsten Jancker, German footballer

September
 September 3 – Jen Royle, American sports reporter and chef
 September 4 – Carmit Bachar, American singer
 September 6
 Tim Henman, English tennis player
 Nina Persson, Swedish singer
 September 7 – Glenn Ljungström, Swedish guitarist
 September 9 – Leah O'Brien, American softball player
 September 10
 Mirko Filipović, Croatian kickboxer; mixed martial arts fighter
 Ryan Phillippe, American actor
 Ben Wallace, American basketball player
 September 14 – Hicham El Guerrouj, Moroccan athlete
 September 15 – Wael Kfoury, Lebanese singer, musician, and songwriter
 September 16 – Loona, Dutch singer
 September 17
 Rasheed Wallace, American basketball player
 Austin St. John, American actor and martial artist
 September 18
 Sol Campbell, English footballer
 Xzibit, American rapper
 September 19
 Jimmy Fallon, American actor, comedian, and television personality
 Victoria Silvstedt, Swedish model
 September 20 – Jon Bernthal, American Actor 
 September 21 – Driulis González, Cuban judoka
 September 23 – Matt Hardy, American professional wrestler
 September 24 – Kati Wolf, Hungarian singer
 September 26 – Joo Jin-mo, South Korean actor
 September 30 – Yul Bürkle, Venezuelan actor and model

October
 October 2 – Rachana Banerjee, Indian film actress 
 October 3 – Marianne Timmer, Dutch speed skater
 October 6 – Hoàng Xuân Vinh, Vietnamese sports shooter
 October 7 
 Shannon MacMillan, American soccer player
 Charlotte Perrelli, Swedish singer
 October 8 – Koji Murofushi, Japanese hammer thrower
 October 10
 Dale Earnhardt Jr., American race car driver
 Oded Kattash, Israeli basketball player and coach
 Chris Pronger, Canadian hockey player
 October 11 – Jason Arnott, Canadian hockey player
 October 15 – Cayetana Álvarez de Toledo, Spanish politician
 October 16
 Aurela Gaçe, Albanian singer
 Paul Kariya, Canadian hockey player
 October 17 – Matthew Macfadyen, English actor
 October 18 
 Susana Díaz, Spanish politician
 Zhou Xun, Chinese actress and singer
 October 21 – Lera Auerbach, Russian composer and pianist
 October 23
 Aravind Adiga, Indian-Australian author
 Sander Westerveld, Dutch soccer player
 October 24 – Catherine Sutherland, Australian actress
 October 28
 Nelly Ciobanu, Moldovan singer
 Joaquin Phoenix, American actor born in Puerto Rico
 October 29
 Akashdeep Saigal, Indian television actor and model
 Yenny Wahid, Indonesian activist and politician

November
 November 2 – Nelly, American rapper
 November 5
 Ryan Adams, American singer and songwriter
 Dado Pršo, Croatian footballer
 Jerry Stackhouse, American basketball player
 November 8
 Penelope Heyns, South African swimmer
 Masashi Kishimoto, Japanese manga author
 Matthew Rhys, Welsh actor
 November 9 – Alessandro Del Piero, Italian football player
 November 10 – Chris Lilley, Australian comedian and actor
 November 11 – Leonardo DiCaprio, American actor, producer and environmentalist
 November 13 – Kerim Seiler, Swiss artist and architect
 November 15
 Chad Kroeger, Canadian singer
 Ingrida Šimonytė, Prime Minister of Lithuania
 November 16 – Paul Scholes, English football player
 November 18 
 Chloë Sevigny, American actress
 Petter Solberg, Norwegian rally driver
 November 20 
 Drew Ginn, Australian rower 
 Kurt Krömer, German television presenter, comedian and actor
 November 24 – Stephen Merchant, English actor and comedian
 November 26 – Roman Šebrle, Czech decathlete
 November 27
 Wendy Houvenaghel, British racing cyclist
 Zsófia Polgár, Hungarian-born chess player
 November 29 – Ferenc Merkli, Hungarian Slovene priest, writer and translator
 November 30 – Wallace Chung, Hong Kong actor and singer

December
 December 1 – Costinha, Portuguese footballer
 December 4 – Anke Huber, German tennis player
 December 5 – Kid Koala, Canadian DJ, turntablist, musician and graphic novelist
 December 7 – Nicole Appleton, Canadian singer
 December 10 – Meg White, American drummer
 December 11
 Rey Mysterio, American wrestler
 Gete Wami, Ethiopian long-distance runner
 December 12 – Michelle Saram, Singaporean singer and actress
 December 17
 Sarah Paulson, American actress
 Giovanni Ribisi, American actor
 December 18
 Kari Byron, American artist and television personality
Mutassim Gaddafi, Libyan Army commander (d. 2011)
 Viki Miljković, Serbian singer
 Nelly Karim, Egyptian actress
 December 19 – Ricky Ponting, Australian cricketer
 December 20 – Paul Linger, English footballer
 December 24
 Marcelo Salas, Chilean footballer
 Ryan Seacrest, American television personality
 December 27 – Alena Vinnitskaya, Ukrainian singer
 December 29 – Mekhi Phifer, American actor
 December 31 – Tony Kanaan, Brazilian racing driver

Deaths

January
 January 1 – Jimmy Smith, American Major League Baseball infielder (b. 1895)
 January 2 – Tex Ritter, American actor and country musician (b. 1905)
 January 3 
 Gino Cervi, Italian actor (b. 1901)
 Red Snapp, American baseball player (b. 1888)
 January 6
 David Alfaro Siqueiros, Mexican painter and muralist (b. 1896)
 Dewey Mayhew, American football coach (b. 1898)
 Lech Pijanowski, Polish screenwriter, film critic, broadcaster and director (b. 1928)
 Margit Slachta, Hungarian politician (b. 1884) 
 January 7 – Wang Shusheng, Chinese general (b. 1905)
 January 8 – Charles-Édouard Ferland, Canadian jurist, Liberal politician and Senator (b. 1892)
 January 10 – Charles G. Bond, U.S. House of Representatives from New York (b. 1877)
 January 11 – Antonio Bautista, Filipino pilot with the Philippine Air Force (b. 1937)
 January 12
 Jack Jacobs, American-born National Football League and Canadian Football League player (b. 1919)
 Princess Patricia of Connaught (b. 1886)
 January 14 – Joseph Dippolito, Italian American Mafia member of the Los Angeles crime syndicate (b. 1914)
 January 15 – Harold D. Cooley, U.S. House of Representatives (b. 1897)
 January 17 – Clara Edwards, American singer, pianist and composer (b. 1880)
 January 18 – Bill Finger, American comic strip and book writer (b. 1914)
 January 19 – Edward Seago, British artist (b. 1910)
 January 20 – Leonard Freeman, American television writer and producer (Hawaii Five-0) (b. 1920)
 January 21 – Robert Guy Howarth, Australian scholar, literary critic and poet (b. 1906)
 January 22 – Oskar Herman, Croatian Jewish painter (b. 1886)
 January 26 – Julius Patzak, Austrian tenor (b. 1898)
 January 27
 Georgios Grivas, Greek-Cypriot colonel (b. 1898)
 Leo Geyr von Schweppenburg, German general (b. 1886)
 January 28 – Oswald Cornwallis, English cricketer (b. 1894)
 January 29 – H. E. Bates, English writer and author (b. 1905)
 January 30 – Bill Whitty, Australian cricketer (b. 1886)
 January 31
 Pina Gallini, Italian actress (b. 1888)
 Samuel Goldwyn, Polish-born American film studio executive (b. 1879)
 Glenn Morris, American Olympic athlete (b. 1912)

February
 February 4 – Satyendra Nath Bose, Indian mathematician and physicist (b. 1894)
 February 15
 Kurt Atterberg, Swedish composer (b. 1887)
 George W. Snedecor, American mathematician and statistician (b. 1881)
 February 16 – Anita Bush, African American stage and silent film actress and playwright. Known as "The Little Mother of Colored Drama"
 February 17 – Ralph W. Gerard, American neurophysiologist and behavioural scientist (b. 1900)
 February 21 – Tim Horton, Canadian ice hockey player and co-founder of the Tim Hortons restaurant chain (b. 1930)
 February 23 
 Harry Ruby, American musician, composer and writer (b. 1885)
 George Van Biesbroeck, American-born Belgian astronomer (b. 1880)
 February 24
 Margaret Leech, American historian and fiction writer (b. 1893)
 Robert A. Stemmle, German screenwriter and film director (b. 1903)

March
 March 1 
 Hüseyin Kemal Gürmen, Turkish theatre and cinema actor (b. 1901)
 Bobby Timmons, American jazz pianist and composer (b. 1935)
 March 2 – Péter Schell, Hungarian politician (b. 1898) 
 March 3
 Barbara Ruick, American actress and singer (b. 1930)
 Frank Wilcox, American character actor (b. 1907)
 March 4 – Adolph Gottlieb, American abstract expressionist painter (b. 1903)
 March 5
 John Samuel Bourque, French-Canadian politician, Cabinet Minister, military member, and businessman from Québec, Canada (b. 1894)
 Billy De Wolfe, American character actor (b. 1907)
 March 6 – Ernest Becker, American anthropologist and writer; who won the 1974 Pulitzer Prize (posthumously) for his book The Denial of Death (b. 1924)
 March 7
 Moriji Mochida, last person ever awarded the 10th dan rank in kendo (b. 1885)
 Hans Sachs, Holocaust survivor and poster collector (b. 1881)
 March 8 – Martha Wentworth, American actress (b. 1889)
 March 9 – Earl Wilbur Sutherland Jr., American physiologist, Nobel Prize laureate (b. 1915)
 March 10 – Alexander John Majeski, American architect and Naval Lieutenant (b. 1920)
 March 12 – Oleksii Shovkunenko, Ukrainian painter (b. 1884)
 March 13 – Red Wing, American actress (b. 1873)
 March 14 – Maulana Shams-ud-din Harifal, Pakistani Islamic scholar (b. 1944)
 March 15 – José Tohá, Chilean Socialist politician, minister (assassinated) (b. 1927)
 March 17 – Louis Kahn, Russian-born American architect (b. 1901)
 March 19 – Edward Platt, American actor known as "The Chief" on NBC/CBS's Get Smart (b. 1916)
 March 20 – Chet Huntley, American television reporter (b. 1911)
 March 21 – Candy Darling, American actress (b. 1944)
 March 22 – Peter Revson, American race car driver (b. 1939)
 March 24 – Lewie G. Merritt, U.S. Marine, major general and aviator (b. 1897)
 March 27
 Wilhelm Herget, German Luftwaffe flying ace (b. 1910)
 Eduardo Santos Montejo, Colombian publisher and politician, 15th President of Colombia (b. 1888)
 March 28 – Dorothy Fields, American librettist and lyricist (b. 1904)
 March 29 
 Andrea Checchi, Italian actor (La ciociara) (b. 1916)
 Joe Stecher, American professional wrestler (b. 1893)
 March 31 – Frank Seno, American football running back and defensive back (b. 1921)

April
 April 2 
 Douglass Dumbrille, Canadian actor (b. 1889)
 Georges Pompidou, 100th Prime Minister of France and 19th President of France, Co-Prince of Andorra (b. 1911)
 April 3 – Ossie Newton-Thompson, South African cricketer and politician (b. 1920)
 April 5 – A. Y. Jackson, Canadian painter and a founding member of the Group of Seven (b. 1882)
 April 6 
 Willem Marinus Dudok, Dutch modernist architect (b. 1884)
 Roy Wood, American professional baseball player (b. 1892)
 April 8 – K. A. C. Creswell, English architectural historian (b. 1879)
 April 9 - Marvin L. Kline, Republican politician (b. 1903)
 April 10 – Patricia Collinge, Irish-born American actress (b. 1892)
 April 11 – Edward Alexander Bott, psychologist at the University of Toronto (b. 1887)
 April 14
 Howard Pease, American adventure novelist (b. 1894)
 Michael Whalen, American actor (b. 1902)
 April 18
 Betty Compson, American actress (b. 1897)
 Marcel Pagnol, French novelist (b. 1895)
 April 19 – Ayub Khan, Pakistanian general and politician, 2nd President of Pakistan (b. 1907)
 April 20 – Peter Lee Lawrence, German actor in Spaghetti Westerns; such as For a Few Dollars More (b. 1944)
 April 21 – Mirja Mane, Finnish actress (b. 1929)
 April 23 – Cy Williams, American baseball player (b. 1887)
 April 24
 Bud Abbott, American comedian (b. 1895)
 Franz Jonas, Austrian political figure, 7th President of Austria (b. 1899)
 April 25 – Gustavo R. Vincenti, Maltese architect and developer (b. 1888)
 April 27 – Hans W. Petersen, Danish actor of over 40 films (b. 1897)
 April 28 – Paul Page, American actor of the 1920s and 1930s (b. 1903)
 April 30 – Agnes Moorehead, American actress (b. 1900)

May
 May 1 – Frank Packer, Australian media proprietor (b. 1906)
 May 2 
 James O. Richardson, American admiral (b. 1878)
 William Wantling, American ex-Marine, poet and novelist (b. 1933)
 May 3
 Nasir Khan, Indian actor (b. 1924)
 Ralph McCabe, Canadian-born Major League Baseball player (b. 1918)
 May 4 – Ludwig Karl Koch, German broadcaster and sound recordist (b. 1881)
 May 6 – Robert Maestri, Mayor of New Orleans (b. 1889)
 May 7
 Abu Bakar of Pahang, Fourth Sultan of Pahang (b. 1904)
 Fred Kelly, American Olympic athlete (b. 1891)
 May 8 – Fred Conyngham, Australian actor (b. 1901)
 May 10 – Takeshi Sakamoto, Japanese actor (b. 1899)
 May 12 – Wayne Maki, Canadian National Hockey League player (b. 1944)
 May 13 – Jaime Torres Bodet, Mexican public servant, 2nd Director-General of the UNESCO (b. 1902)
 May 14 – Jacob L. Moreno, Romanian-American psychiatrist and psychosociologist (b. 1889)
 May 15 – Guy Simonds, Canadian Lieutenant-General, commander of the Canadian Armed Forces in World War II (b. 1903)
 May 16 – Billy Welu, American professional bowler (b. 1932)
 May 17 – Symbionese Liberation Army shootout with the Los Angeles Police Department 
 Angela Atwood, American founding member of the Symbionese Liberation Army (b. 1949)
 Donald DeFreeze, American leader of the Symbionese Liberation Army who went by the nom de guerre "Field Marshal Cinque" (b. 1943)
 Camilla Hall, American member of the Symbionese Liberation Army, one of main kidnappers of heiress Patricia Hearst (b. 1945)
 Nancy Ling Perry, American member of the Symbionese Liberation Army (b. 1947)
 Patricia Soltysik, American member of the Symbionese Liberation Army (b. 1950)
 May 18 – Sir Harry Ricardo, English mechanical engineer (b. 1885)
 May 19 – Allal al-Fassi, Moroccan politician, poet, writer and scholar (b. 1910)
 May 20 – Jean Daniélou, French Catholic cardinal, theologian and academic (b. 1905)
 May 21 – Lily Kronberger, Hungarian figure skater (b. 1890)
 May 24 – Duke Ellington, American jazz pianist and bandleader (b. 1899)
 May 25
 Donald Crisp, English-American actor, film director, screenwriter and producer (b. 1882)
 Arturo Jauretche, Argentine writer, politician and philosopher (b. 1901)
 May 26 – Kitty Gordon, English stage and silent film actress. (b. 1878)
 May 27 – Rudolf Altstadt, German soldier in World War II (b. 1914)
 May 28 – Francesco Fausto Nitti, Italian journalist (b. 1899)
 May 31
 Adelle Davis, American author and nutritionist (b. 1904)
 Frederick George Topham, Canadian soldier and recipient of the Victoria Cross (b. 1917)

June
 June 1 – Henry Clay Sevier, American lawyer and member from Louisiana House of Representatives (b. 1896)
 June 2 – Roger C. Slaughter, American lawyer and U.S. Representative from Missouri (b. 1905)
 June 3 – Rashid Nezhmetdinov, Soviet chess player (b. 1912)
 June 4
 Smokey Harris, Canadian ice hockey player (b. 1890)
 Mamerto Urriolagoitía, 43rd President of Bolivia (b. 1895)
 June 5 – Larry Cabrelli, American football player and assistant coach Philadelphia Eagles (b. 1917)
 June 7 – Abdul Rahman Hashim, Malaysian Inspector-General of Police (b. 1925) 
 June 9 
 Miguel Ángel Asturias, Guatemalan writer, Nobel Prize laureate (b. 1890)
 Katharine Cornell, Berlin-born, American stage actress, writer, theatre owner, and producer (b. 1893)
 Carlo Pisacane, Italian actor (b. 1889)
 June 10 – Prince Henry, Duke of Gloucester, 11th Governor-General of Australia (b. 1900)
 June 11 
 Eurico Gaspar Dutra, Brazilian marshal and 16th President of Brazil (b. 1883)
 Julius Evola, Italian philosopher (b. 1898)
 June 12 – André Marie, French Radical politician, 65th Prime Minister of France (b. 1897)
 June 14 – Knud Jeppesen, Danish musicologist, composer, and songwriter (b. 1892)
 June 15 – Kevin Gately, English mathematics student at University of Warwick involved in the Red Lion Square disorders (b. 1953)
 June 16
 Amalie Sara Colquhoun, Australian landscape and portrait painter (b. 1894)
 Mauritz Hugo, Swedish-born American film and television actor (b. 1909)
 June 17 
 Pamela Britton, American actress (b. 1923)
 Austin Gunsel, 3rd commissioner of the National Football League (b. 1909)
Joseph Lê Văn Ấn, 57, Vietnamese Roman Catholic prelate, bishop of Xuân Lộc (1965–1974).
 June 18 – Georgy Zhukov, Soviet Army marshal and Minister of Defence (b. 1896)
 June 21 – Katsutaro Kouta, Japanese female geisha and ryūkōka singer (b. 1904) 
 June 22 – Darius Milhaud, French composer (b. 1892)
 June 23 – Calvin B. Hoover, noted U.S. economist and professor (b. 1897)
 June 24 – József Juhász, Hungarian stage and film actor (b. 1908)
 June 25 – Cornelius Lanczos, Hungarian mathematician and physicist (b. 1893)
 June 26 – Ernest Gruening, American journalist, Governor of Alaska Territory from 1939 to 1953, and United States Senator from 1959 to 1969 (b. 1887) 
 June 27 – Fred DeStefano, American football player and physician; who won the National Football League title with the Chicago Cardinals of 1925 (b. 1900)
 June 28
 Vannevar Bush, American engineer, inventor and science administrator (b. 1890)
 Frank Sutton, American actor (b. 1923)
 June 29 – José Maria Ferreira de Castro, Portuguese writer and journalist (b. 1898)
 June 30 – Alberta Williams King, American civil rights champion, wife of Martin Luther King, Sr., and mother of Martin Luther King Jr. (b. 1904)

July
 July 1 – Juan Perón, Argentine army general and politician, 2-time President of Argentina (b. 1895)
 July 2
 Sonia Holm, English actress (b. 1920)
 Edith L. Sharp, Canadian writer (b. 1911)
 July 4 
 Georgette Heyer, British writer (b. 1902)
 André Randall, French actor (b. 1892)
 July 6 – Joseph Baldacchino, Maltese archaeologist (b. 1894)
 July 7 
 Leon Shamroy, American Academy Award-winning cinematographer (b. 1901)
 Cornelius Vanderbilt IV, American publisher and member of the Vanderbilt Family (b. 1898)
 July 8
 Mário Simões Dias, Portuguese violinist (b. 1902)
 Margaret Furse, British Academy Award-winning costume designer for Anne of the Thousand Days (b. 1911)
 July 9 – Earl Warren, American jurist and politician, Chief Justice of the United States Supreme Court (b. 1891)
 July 10 – Nancy Wickwire, American soap opera actress (b. 1925)
 July 11 
 Edward Beck, British army officer (b. 1880)
 Pär Lagerkvist, Swedish writer, Nobel Prize laureate (b. 1891)
 July 12 – Sonja Ludvigsen, Norwegian politician (b. 1928)
 July 13
 Patrick Blackett, Baron Blackett, British physicist, Nobel Prize laureate (b. 1897)
 Prince Christian of Schaumburg-Lippe (b. 1898)
 July 14
Dame Sibyl Hathaway, Seigneur of Sark (b. 1884)
 Carl Andrew Spaatz, U.S. Air Force general (b. 1891)
 July 15
 William Albrecht, Chairman of the Department of Soils at the University of Missouri (b. 1888)
 Christine Chubbuck, American TV personality (b. 1944)
 Victor Negus, British surgeon (b. 1887)
 July 17 – Dizzy Dean, American baseball player (St. Louis Cardinals) and a member of the MLB Hall of Fame (b. 1910)
 July 19 – Joe Flynn, American actor (b. 1924)
 July 20 – Charles Rudolph d'Olive, American World War I ace (b. 1896)
 July 22 – Wayne Morse, American lawyer, politician, and United States Senator from Oregon (1945–1969) (b. 1900)
 July 23 – Peter Lei, Bishop of Hong Kong (b. 1922) 
 July 24 – Sir James Chadwick, British physicist, Nobel Prize laureate (b. 1891)
 July 25 – Robert Hanbidge, Canadian lawyer and politician, Mayor of Kerrobert and 12th Lieutenant-Governor of Saskatchewan (b. 1891)
 July 27 – Joop Pelser, Dutch footballer (b. 1892)
 July 29
 Cass Elliot, American vocalist (b. 1941)
 Erich Kästner, German author (b. 1899)
 July 30 – Lev Knipper, Soviet composer (b. 1898)

August
 August 2 – Cyril Smith, English virtuoso concert pianist (b. 1909)
 August 3
 Edna Murphy, American actress of the silent era (b. 1899) 
 Almira Sessions, American character actress (b. 1888)
 August 4 – Józef Kondrat, Polish stage and film actor (b. 1902)
 August 5 – Friedrich F. Tippmann, Hungarian entomologist (b. 1894)
 August 6 – Gunboat Smith, Irish-born American boxer and referee (b. 1887)
 August 7 – Rosario Castellanos, Méxican poet and author (b. 1925) 
 August 8 – Baldur von Schirach, Nazi German Hitler Youth leader (b. 1907)
 August 11
 José Falcón, Portuguese matador (gored to death by bull) (b. 1944)
 Jan Tschichold, German-born typographer (b. 1902)
 August 13 – Ernst Forsthoff, German jurist (b. 1902)
 August 14 – Romuald Bourque, French-Canadian politician from Québec (b. 1889)
 August 15 – Edmund Cobb, American actor (b. 1892)
 August 17 – Aldo Palazzeschi, Italian novelist, poet, journalist and essayist (b. 1885)
 August 18 – J. C. Winslow, British missionary to India for Society for the Propagation of the Gospel (b. 1882)
 August 19 – Rodger Davies, American diplomat (assassinated) (b. 1921)
 August 20 – Magda Sonja, Austrian actress (b. 1886)
 August 21 – Buford Pusser, American Sheriff of McNairy County, Tennessee (b. 1937)
 August 22 – Jacob Bronowski, Polish-Jewish British mathematician, biologist and science historian (b. 1908)
 August 23 – Roberto Assagioli, Italian psychiatrist and pioneer (b. 1888)
 August 24 – Alexander P. de Seversky, Russian-American aviation pioneer and inventor (b. 1894)
 August 26 – Charles Lindbergh, American aviator (Spirit of St. Louis) (b. 1902)
 August 27 – Otto Strasser, Nazi German politician (b. 1897)
 August 28 – 
 Aleksandar Sekulović, Montenegrin cinematographer (b. 1918)
 Lawrence Jones, American UMWA member who was martyred after being slain by a strikebreaker (b. 1950)
 August 29
 Judith Furse, English actress (b. 1912)
 Fred W. Preller, American politician (b. 1902)
 August 30 – Kenneth Anderson, Indian-British writer and hunter (b. 1910)
 August 31 
 Ali bin Abdullah Al Thani, Emir of Qatar (b. 1895)
 Norman Kirk, New Zealander politician, 29th Prime Minister of New Zealand (b. 1923)
 Gianna Manzini, Italian writer (b. 1896)

September
 September 1 – Mary Broadfoot Walker, Scottish physician (b. 1888)
 September 2 – Walter Strenge, American cinematographer (b. 1898)
 September 3 – Harry Partch, American composer (b. 1901)
 September 4
 Creighton Abrams, American general (b. 1914)
 Marcel Achard, French playwright and scriptwriter (b. 1899)
 September 6
 Olga Baclanova, Soviet stage and screen actress, operatic singer, and ballerina (b. c. 1893)
 Otto Kruger, American actor (b. 1885)
 September 7 – Juan Antonio Ipiña, Spanish football manager (b. 1912)
 September 8 
 Dhani Nivat, Prince of Thailand (b. 1885)
 Bert Niehoff, American Major League Baseball player (b. 1884)
 Jimmy Swinnerton, American cartoonist, Little Jimmy (b. 1875)
 September 10 – Melchior Wańkowicz, Polish army officer, writer, journalist, and publisher (b. 1892)
 September 11 – Robert Nodar Jr., American Republican politician from New York and its member of the United States House of Representatives (b. 1916)
 September 12
 Prince Nikita Alexandrovich of Russia (b. 1900)
 Craig Woods, American actor (b. 1918)
 September 15 – René Capistrán Garza, Méxican Association of Catholic Youth leader, lawyer, screenwriter, and film critic (b. 1898)
 September 16 – Phog Allen, American basketball and baseball player (b. 1885)
 September 17 – Claudia Morgan, American actress, The Edge of Night in the 1950s (b. 1912)
 September 18 – Edna Best, British actress (b. 1900)
 September 19 
 Tránsito Cocomarola, Argentine musician and folklorist (b. 1918)
 Zack Taylor, American baseball player and manager (b. 1898)
 September 20
 Fray José de Guadalupe Mojica, Mexican Franciscan friar, singer, and actor (b. 1896)
 Sir Arthur Rylah, Australian lawyer and politician. (b. 1909)
 September 21 
 Walter Brennan, American actor; 3-time Best Supporting Academy Award-winning actor (1936, 1938, and 1940) (b. 1894)
 Jacqueline Susann, American writer and actress (b. 1918)
 September 22
 Winfried Otto Schumann, German physicist (b. 1888)
 George Spahn, American rancher connected to the Manson family (b. 1889)
 September 23 – Cliff Arquette, American comedian who created the character Charlie Weaver (b. 1905)
 September 24 – Dorothy Stone, American actress (b. 1905)
 September 26 – Jean Gale, American vaudeville performer (b. 1912)
 September 27 
 Silvio Frondizi, Argentine intellectual and lawyer (b. 1907)
 James R. Webb, American soldier and screenwriter who won the 1963 Academy Award for How the West Was Won (b. 1909)
 September 28 – Arnold Fanck, German film director who pioneered in the mountain film genre (b. 1889)
 September 30 
 Carlos Prats, Chilean general and politician (assassinated) (b. 1915)
 Sofía Cuthbert, wife of Carlos Prats (b. 1918)

October
 October 1
 Stephen Latchford, American diplomat and aviation expert (b. 1883)
 Frederick Moosbrugger, American admiral (b. 1900)
 October 2 – Vasily Shukshin, Soviet actor, writer, screenwriter, and director from the Altai region (b. 1929)
 October 3 – Bessie Louise Pierce, American historian (b. 1888)
 October 4
 Robert Lee Moore, American mathematician (b. 1882)
 Anne Sexton, American poet and writer (b. 1928)
 October 5 
 Virgil Miller, American cinematographer (b. 1886)
 Zalman Shazar, 3rd President of Israel (b. 1889)
 October 6 – V. K. Krishna Menon, Indian statesman, diplomat and nationalist (b. 1896) 
 October 7 – Henry J. Cadbury, American biblical scholar and Quaker (b. 1883)
 October 8 – Harry Carney, American jazz musician (b. 1910)
 October 9 
 Theodore Foley, American Roman Catholic priest and servant of God (b. 1913)
 Oskar Schindler, Sudetgerman businessman (b. 1908)
 October 10 – Werner Heyking, Danish actor, Willy Wonka & the Chocolate Factory (1971) (b. 1913)
 October 11 – Frank Kowalski, American soldier United States Army and United States representative from Connecticut (b. 1907)
 October 13
 Josef Krips, Austrian conductor and violinist (b. 1902)
 Sam Rice, American baseball player (Washington Senators) and a member of the MLB Hall of Fame (b. 1890)
 Ed Sullivan, American television host (b. 1901)
 October 14 – Sattar Bahlulzade, Azerbaijani landscape painter (b. 1909)
 October 16 – Vlasta Dekanova, Czechoslovak artistic gymnast (b. 1909)
 October 17 
 Johannes Krahn, German architect (b. 1908)
 Tomotaka Tasaka, Japanese film director (b. 1902)
 October 18 – Anders Lange, Norwegian politician (b. 1902)
 October 19
 Farrukh Ahmad, Bangladeshi poet and writer (b. 1918)
 Nur Ali Elahi, Iranian jurist, musician, and spiritual thinker (b. 1895)
 October 20 – Élie Lescot, 29th President of Haiti, leader of the World War II (b. 1883)
 October 21 – Donald Goines, American writer of urban fiction (b. 1936)
 October 23 – Melchior Lengyel, Hungarian writer, dramatist, and film screenwriter (b. 1880)
 October 24 – David Oistrakh, Ukrainian violinist (b. 1908)
 October 25 – Fahrettin Altay, Ottoman military officer (b. 1880)
 October 26 – Bidia Dandaron, Buryat Buddhist practitioner in the USSR (b. 1914) 
 October 27 
 Paul Frankeur, French actor (b. 1905)
 C. P. Ramanujam, Indian mathematician (b. 1938)
 October 30 – Begum Akhtar, Indian singer (b. 1914)
 October 31 – Mikheil Chiaureli, Soviet Georgian filmmaker (b. 1894)

November
 November 1 – Ralf Harolde, American character actor (b. 1899)
 November 2
 Richard Kroner, German neo-Hegelian philosopher (b. 1884)
 Farid-ud-Din Qadri, Pakistani Islamic scholar (b. 1918)
 November 3 – Mamá Tingó, Dominican activist (b. 1921)
 November 4 – Harry Fritz, American baseball player Chicago Whales (b. 1890)
 November 5 
 Marguerite Namara, American lyric soprano (b. 1888)
 Stafford Repp, American actor noted for his work on the Batman (TV Series) (b. 1918)
 November 7
 Rodolfo Acosta, Mexican-born American actor (b. 1920)
 Eric Linklater, British author (b. 1899)
 November 8 – Ivory Joe Hunter, American rhythm & blues singer, songwriter, and pianist (b. 1914)
 November 9 – Egon Wellesz, British composer, teacher and musicologist (b. 1885)
 November 13 
 Vittorio De Sica, Italian actor and film director (b. 1901)
 Karen Silkwood, American chemical technician and labor union activist (b. 1946)
 November 14 – Johnny Mack Brown, American football star and actor (b. 1904)
 November 15 
 Robert Hugo, Duke of Parma (b. 1909)
 Konstantin Shayne, Russian-born, American actor (b. 1888)
 November 16 – Walther Meissner, German technical physicist (b. 1882)
 November 17 
 Erskine Hamilton Childers, Irish politician, 4th President of Ireland (b. 1905)
 Clive Brook, English actor (b. 1887)
 November 18 – Gösta Lilliehöök, Swedish pentathlete and 1912 Olympic Games champion (b. 1884)
 November 19 – Alessandro Momo, Italian actor (b. 1956) 
 November 21
 Julia Navarrete Guerrero, Mexican Roman Catholic religious professed and venerable (b. 1881)
 Frank Martin, Swiss composer (b. 1890)
 November 22 – Ilie Antonescu, Romanian general (b. 1894)
 November 23
 Cornelius Ryan, Irish-born American writer (b. 1920)
 Massacre of the Sixty in Ethiopia of government and military officials.
 Abiye Abebe, politician and army officer (b. 1918)
 Aklilu Habte-Wold, politician and 6th Prime Minister of Ethiopia (b. 1912)
 Aman Andom, army officer and 1st President of Ethiopia (b. 1924)
 Asrate Medhin Kassa, aristocrat and army officer (b. 1922)
 Endelkachew Makonnen, politician and 4th Prime Minister of Ethiopia (b. 1927)
 November 25
 Nick Drake, British musician (b. 1948)
 U Thant, Burmese diplomat and 3rd Secretary-General of the United Nations (b. 1909)
 November 27 – T. A. Madhuram, Tamil stage & film actress and film producer (b. 1918)
 November 28 – Konstantin Melnikov, Soviet architect (b. 1890)
 November 29
 James J. Braddock, American boxer (b. 1905)
 Peng Dehuai, Chinese military leader (b. 1898)

December
 December 1 – Anita Brenner, Mexican anthropologist, historian and author (b. 1905)
 December 2 
 Sophie Carmen Eckhardt-Gramatté, Russian-born, Canadian composer, virtuoso pianist, & violinist (b. 1899)
 Sylvi Kekkonen, Finnish writer and wife of President of Finland Urho Kekkonen (b. 1900)
 Max Weber, Swiss Federal Councilor (b. 1897)
 December 3 – Hans Leibelt, German film actor (b. 1885)
 December 4 – Lee Kinsolving, American actor (b. 1938)
 December 5 
 Pietro Germi, Italian actor, screenwriter and director (b. 1914)
 Zaharia Stancu, Romanian prose writer (b. 1902)
 Hazel Hotchkiss Wightman, American tennis player (b. 1886)
 December 6
 Einar Texas Ljungberg, Swedish Socialist politician (b. 1880)
 Frederik Jacobus Johannes Buytendijk, Dutch anthropologist, biologist and psychologist (b. 1887)
 Nikolay Gerasimovich Kuznetsov, Russian admiral (b. 1904)
 Luigi Salvatorelli, Italian historian and publicist (b. 1886)
 December 7 – Ariyavangsagatayana, 17th Supreme Patriarch of Thailand, Member of the Chetupon Temple (b. 1896)
 December 8 – Nadia Benois, Russian painter and stage designer; also the mother of English actor Peter Ustinov (b. 1896)
 December 9
 Hans Traut, German General-Lieutenant in the Nazi Wehrmacht in World War II (b. 1895)
 Ludwig Weber, Austrian bass (b. 1899)
 December 10 – Paul Richards, American actor, Beneath the Planet of the Apes (b. 1924)
 December 11
 Maravillas de Jesús, Spanish Roman Catholic professed member of the Discalced Carmelites and saint (b. 1891)
 Reed Hadley, American radio, television and film actor (b. 1911)
 December 12 – Booker McDaniels, American baseball pitcher in the Negro leagues with (Kansas City Monarchs) (b. 1913)
 December 13 – John G. Bennett, British mathematician (b. 1897)
 December 14 – Walter Lippmann, American writer and journalist (b. 1889)
 December 15 – Anatole Litvak, Ukrainian-born film director (b. 1902)
 December 16 – Kostas Varnalis, Greek poet (b. 1884)
 December 17
 Luis Almarcha Hernández, Spanish cleric, politician and Roman Catholic bishop (b. 1887)
 Bing Slamet, Indonesian singer, songwriter, comedian and actor (b. 1927)
 December 18 – Harry Hooper, American baseball player (Boston Red Sox) and a member of the MLB Hall of Fame (b. 1887)
 December 19
 Bernd von Brauchitsch, German air force officer (b. 1911)
 Catrano Catrani, Italian-born Argentine director & producer (b. 1910)
 December 20 – André Jolivet, French composer (b. 1905)
 December 21 – Richard Long, American actor (b. 1927)
 December 22 – Gordon Purdy, Canadian Liberal politician (b. 1888)
 December 23 – Jules Rykovich, Croatian-born, American football player (b. 1923)
 December 24 – Sentarō Ōmori, Japanese admiral (b. 1892)
 December 25 – Gorman Kennedy, Canadian executive and general manager of the Montreal Alouettes from (1957 to 1959) (b. 1907)
 December 26
 Jack Benny, American actor (b. 1894)
 Frank Hussey, American Olympic athlete (b. 1905)
 December 27
 Bob Custer, American film actor (b. 1898)
 Vladimir Fock, Soviet physicist (b. 1898)
 Ned Maddrell, last surviving native speaker of the Manx language (b. 1877)
 December 28 – Zachary Cope, British physician and surgeon (b. 1881)
 December 29
 Robert Ellis, American actor (b. 1892)
 William Charles Fuller, Welsh soldier and recipient of the Victoria Cross (b. 1884)
 December 30
 George Howard Earle III, American politician and diplomat; served as Governor of Pennsylvania from 1935 to 1939 (b. 1890)
 Sid Terris, American boxer (b. 1904)
 December 31
 Dogen Handa, Japanese professional Go player (b. 1914)
 Robert Pache, Swiss footballer (b. 1897)

Nobel Prizes

 Physics – Sir Martin Ryle, Antony Hewish
 Chemistry – Paul Flory
 Medicine – Albert Claude, Christian de Duve, George Emil Palade
 Literature – Eyvind Johnson, Harry Martinson
 Peace – Seán MacBride, Eisaku Satō
 Economics – Gunnar Myrdal, Friedrich Hayek

References